Henkries is a settlement near the Orange River, 13 km west of Goodhouse. Derived from Khoekhoen, the name, also encountered as Henkrees, Henkeriss and Hamneries, means 'mountain slope'. Henkriesmond is also known as Increase, an example of popular etymology, while the name Henkries has led to a story in which a dying man, found by Balis, is said to have muttered he was 'hungry', which became Henkries.

References

Populated places in the Nama Khoi Local Municipality